The Island Corridor Foundation (ICF) is a Canadian non-profit that owns all former Canadian Pacific and Esquimalt & Nanaimo Railway (E&N) track on Vancouver Island in British Columbia.  The foundation was created in 2003 and gained the first of track in 2006 when Canadian Pacific donated its portion of the line to the ICF. Later that year RailAmerica also donated its portion to the foundation, leaving the ICF in control of the entire right of way. Southern Railway of British Columbia, part of the Washington Companies, was selected in 2006 as the exclusive operator on the track, both of freight and Via Rail's Victoria – Courtenay train.

The ICF is a partnership of the various local governments and First Nations communities along the railway, including 14 municipalities, 5 regional districts and 12 First Nations territories.

See also 
 Island Rail Corridor

References

External links
 E&N Division — Canadian Railroad Historical Association

Transport on Vancouver Island